Machina may refer to:

Machina (band), a rock and metal band
Machina (company), a clothing brand company specializing in wearable technology
Machina (magazine), Polish music magazine
Machina, Nigeria, a Local Government Area in Yoba State
Machina/The Machines of God, a 2000 album by The Smashing Pumpkins
Machina II/The Friends & Enemies of Modern Music, another 2000 album by The Smashing Pumpkins
Mark J. Machina (born 1954), American economist
Queen Machina, one of the main villains from Power Rangers Zeo
An earlier title for Elephants Dream, a Blender 3D animated short film
A machine-based weapon in Baten Kaitos Origins
A powered machine in Final Fantasy X

See also 
 Ex Machina (disambiguation)
 Deus ex machina (disambiguation)
 Vox Machina (disambiguation)